Thursday Night Live is an Australian sports program that first aired on One on 2 April 2009. It aired on Thursdays at 7.30pm, and ran for two hours.

The show was hosted by Bill Woods, with regular panelists Nicole Livingstone (former Olympic swimmer), Cameron McConville (former V8 driver), Luke Darcy (former AFL player) and Jeremy Smith (former NRL player) appearing throughout the show. Mark Howard appeared on the show as the quiz host and announcer. Woods also crosses to Brad McEwan to see what is coming up on Sports Tonight.

The show was filmed in front of a live audience at the Ten Studios in Sydney.

The show did not return in 2011.

References

10 Bold original programming
10 Sport
Australian sports television series
2009 Australian television series debuts
2010 Australian television series endings